Højre (Right) was the name of two Danish political parties of Conservative persuasion.

The  existed from 1848 to 1866.

The , centred on Prime Minister J.B.S. Estrup, was founded in 1881. The party was succeeded by the Conservative People's Party, founded in 1916.

References

Political parties established in 1881
Conservative parties in Denmark
1848 establishments in Denmark
1881 establishments in Denmark
Political parties disestablished in 1866
Defunct political parties in Denmark